Xiefu or Xie was the original Marquis of Jin, and the second ruler of the State of Jin during the early Zhou Dynasty. His ancestral name was Ji (姬), and given name Xie (燮) or Xiefu (燮父).

Marquis Xie succeeded his father, Shu Yu of Tang, as the ruler of the state of Tang. During his reign, he moved the capital from Tang (唐) to Jin (晉) and renamed the state Jin.

After he died, his son Ningzu succeeded him as Marquis Wu of Jin.

References

Monarchs of Jin (Chinese state)